Oak Hills is a census-designated place (CDP) in Des Moines County, Iowa, United States. U.S. Route 61 forms the western edge of the community. It consists of residences surrounding Spirit Hollow Golf Course.

Oak Hills was first listed as a CDP prior to the 2020 census.

Demographics

References 

Census-designated places in Iowa